Behāfarīd (Middle Persian: Weh-āfrīd, also spelled Bihāfarīd) was an 8th-century Persian Zoroastrian heresiarch who started a religious peasant revolt with elements from Zoroastrianism and Islam. He believed in Zoroaster and upheld all Zoroastrian institutions. His followers prayed seven times a day facing the sun, prohibited intoxicants, and kept their hair long and disallowed sacrifices of cattle except when they were decrepit. His revolt was quelled by the Abbasid general Abu Muslim, and he was executed by hanging. His followers, however, believed that he would descend again.  Some of his followers joined the Ustadh Sis movement.

See also 
 Ustadh Sis
 Ishaq al-Turk
 Sunpadh
 al-Muqanna

References

External links

Sources 

Iranian Zoroastrians
8th-century Iranian people
Iranian religious leaders
Iranian prophets
Politicians from Nishapur
Iranian rebels
Neo-Zoroastrianism